The Waterman Hills are a low mountain range in the Mojave Desert, just north of Barstow in San Bernardino County, California.

References 

Mountain ranges of the Mojave Desert
Mountain ranges of San Bernardino County, California
Hills of California